William Stryker Gummere (1852–1933) was chief justice of the Supreme Court of New Jersey.  Gummere was captain of the Princeton football team that met Rutgers in 1869 in the first intercollegiate football game played in America.

After graduating from Princeton in 1870 at the age of 18, Gummere studied law at his father's office in Trenton and was admitted to the bar in 1873, the same year he received his A.M. from Princeton.  Gummere received an honorary LL.D. in June 1902 from Princeton.  In the Class of 1870s twentieth reunion book, Gummere said he was a Republican. "Consequently," he added, "I have never held office. Republicans don't as a usual thing hold office in New Jersey."  This pessimism proved premature because five years later a Democratic governor appointed Gummere to the Supreme Court of New Jersey, and six years after that a Republican governor appointed him Chief Justice, a position he held until his death thirty-two years later.

Gummere was appointed an associate justice of the New Jersey Supreme Court in 1895.  On January 28, 1901, he was appointed to the position of chief justice and sworn in as such on November 19, 1901 along with Mahlon Pitney who was sworn in on same day as associate justice.  Prior to serving on the NJ Supreme Court, Gummere became popularly known as "Dollar-a-life Gummere" after his ruling in a Jersey City case where a child had been killed in a street railroad accident. The parents brought suit for $50,000 compensation, but Justice Gummere ruled that a child's life is financially not worth more than $1 to its parents.  After stubborn fighting in the courts, and taking the case to the highest tribunal in the State, Justice Gummere was overborne and $1000 awarded the parents of the dead child. (Abram Graham vs. Jersey City Consolidated Traction Company. Case came into court April 10, 1896. Justice Gummere made his ruling July 20, 1896. Appeal was taken and the case was settled November 11, 1901.

1852 births
1933 deaths
19th-century players of American football
New Jersey lawyers
Chief Justices of the Supreme Court of New Jersey
Justices of the Supreme Court of New Jersey
Princeton University alumni
Lawrenceville School alumni
Princeton Tigers football players
19th-century American lawyers